Castnius pelasgus is a moth in the Castniidae family. It is found in Suriname, Peru and Amazonas.

The wingspan is about 60 mm. Adults are very dark brown. There is a transverse white-creamy band found on the forewing that runs from the mid-costal margin to the inner angle. The hindwings are dark brown. There are two parallel creamy bands found alongside the dorsal part of the abdomen.

Subspecies
Castnius pelasgus pelasgus (Surinam)
Castnius pelasgus fulvofasciata (Houlbert, 1917) (Peru, Amazonas)

References

Moths described in 1779
Castniidae